
Gmina Zakrzewo is a rural gmina (administrative district) in Złotów County, Greater Poland Voivodeship, in west-central Poland.

Villages
Gmina Zakrzewo contains the villages and settlements of Czernice, Drożyska Małe, Drożyska Średnie, Drożyska Wielkie, Głomsk, Karolewo, Kujan, Kujanki, Łączyn, Ługi, Nowa Wiśniewka, Nowe Zakrzewo, Nowy Głomsk, Osowiec, Poborcze, Prochy, Śmiardowo Złotowskie, Stara Wiśniewka, Stawnicki Młyn, Wersk, Wierzchołek and Zakrzewo.

Neighbouring gminas
Gmina Zakrzewo is bordered by the gminas of Lipka, Więcbork and Złotów.

References
Polish official population figures 2006

Zakrzewo
Gmina Zakrzewo

de:Zakrzewo (Powiat Złotowski)#Gmina Zakrzewo